The Best American Short Stories 1998, a volume in The Best American Short Stories series, was edited by Katrina Kenison and by guest editor Garrison Keillor.

Short stories included

Other notable stories

Among the other notable writers whose stories were among the "100 Other Distinguished Stories of 1997" were Ann Beattie, T. C. Boyle, Michael Chabon, Louise Erdrich, Jeffrey Eugenides, Tess Gallagher, Joyce Carol Oates, Annie Proulx, and Tobias Wolff.

Notes

1998 anthologies
Fiction anthologies
Short Stories 1998
Houghton Mifflin books